Žalvarinis (English: made from brass) is a folk rock band from Vilnius, Lithuania. They were formed in 2001 as a collaboration between the pagan metal group Ugnėlakis and the pagan folk group Kūlgrinda. This was reflected in the title of their debut album in 2002, Ugnėlakis su Kūlgrinda.

Style 
The lyrics for band's songs are usually taken from the folklore of Lithuanian people and are sung in their original Lithuanian language. Žalvarinis' music frequently features singing technique of traditional Lithuanian sutartinė (a form of glee), usually sung by band's three female singers – examples of sutartinė can be heard in tracks Ailiom susėdom, Dijūta or Ožys. Authentic pronunciation as well as ancient words and their forms in folk songs are also usually preserved by the band. As a legacy of Kūlgrinda, the band also features few folk-songs of Old Prussians.

Žalvarinis's sound, on the other hand, while still influenced by traditional Lithuanian folk music, is more modern – generally speaking, it is a mix of traditional heavy metal and progressive rock. The first album of the band was metal-influenced, however with later albums, the sound becomes more progressive.

The song Aš kanapį sėjau (I Sowed a Hemp), taken from the 2005 album Žalio vario was featured on Transformations in Lithuanian Song – a 2006 compilation CD that covered the development of Lithuanian folk music over many years, published by the Lithuanian-American journal Lituanus.

Members

Current members 
Robertas Semeniukas - vocals, electric, acoustic and slide guitars, keyboards, music director
Sigita Jonynaitė - vocals
Viltė Ambrazaitytė - vocals
Rytis Vasiliauskas - bass guitar
Sergej Makidon - drums

Former members 
Domas Žostautas - bass guitar
Jonas Lengvinas - drums
Tadas Žukauskas - bass guitar
Ineta Meduneckytė-Tamošiūnienė – vocals
Laurita Peleniūtė – vocals
Paulius Jaskūnas – bass guitar
Simonas Gudelis – drums
Aurimas Lemežis – bass guitar
Marius Būda – electric guitar
Ramūnas Pocius – vocals, pipes
Eglė Pakšytė – vocals
Dariush Loznikoff – bass
Demonas – bass
Arūnas Lukaševičius – bass
Ilja Molodcov – drums
Aidas Buivydas – guitar

Discography 
Ugnėlakis su Kūlgrinda (2002, Bomba records)
Žalio vario (2005, Prior music) translates as [Made] of Green Copper, green copper being an archaic name for brass
Folk n' Rock (2008, Monako Productions)
Gyvas (2014, Robertas Semeniukas)
Teka (2016, Robertas Semeniukas)
Einam Tolyn (2018, Robertas Semeniukas)
The Best of Žalvarinis (2019, Robertas Semeniukas)
Švęskime Laisvę! (2019, Robertas Semeniukas)
Demo & Remix 2008-2015 (2020, Robertas Semeniukas)
Cantabile (2022, Robertas Semeniukas)

Further reading

External links 

Official homepage 
https://www.facebook.com/ZalvarinisBand/
https://www.youtube.com/user/zalvarinisofficial
https://www.instagram.com/zalvarinis_official/
https://zalvarinis.bandcamp.com
https://soundcloud.com/zalvarinis_music
Žalvarinis on Myspace
Encyclopaedia Metallum 

Lithuanian folk metal musical groups
Lithuanian heavy metal musical groups
Musical groups established in 2001
Modern pagan musical groups
Modern paganism in Lithuania
Baltic modern paganism